David of Scotland (Medieval Gaelic: Dabíd) (1152 – 17 June 1219) was a Scottish prince and 8th Earl of Huntingdon. He was, until 1198, heir to the Scottish throne.

Life
He was the youngest surviving son of Henry of Scotland, 3rd Earl of Huntingdon and Ada de Warenne, a daughter of William de Warenne, 2nd Earl of Surrey, and Elizabeth of Vermandois. His paternal grandfather was David I of Scotland. Huntingdon was granted to him after his elder brother William I of Scotland ascended the throne. David's son John succeeded him to the earldom.

In 1190 his brother gave him 'superiority' over Dundee and its port. The same year he endowed Lindores Abbey in Fife and a church dedicated to St Mary in Dundee.

In the litigation for succession to the crown of Scotland in 1290–1292, the great-great-grandson Floris V, Count of Holland of David's sister, Ada, claimed that David had renounced his hereditary rights to the throne of Scotland. He therefore declared that his claim to the throne had priority over David's descendants. However, no explanation or firm evidence for the supposed renunciation could be provided.

Marriage and issue
On 26 August 1190 David married Matilda of Chester  (1171 – 6 January 1233), daughter of Hugh de Kevelioc, 3rd Earl of Chester. He was almost twenty years Matilda's senior. The marriage was recorded by Benedict of Peterborough.

David and Matilda had seven children:
 Margaret of Huntingdon (c. 1194 – c. 1228), married Alan, Lord of Galloway, by whom she had two daughters, including Dervorguilla of Galloway.
 Robert of Huntingdon (died young)
 Ada of Huntingdon, married Sir Henry de Hastings, by whom she had one son, Henry de Hastings, 1st Baron Hastings.
 Matilda (Maud) of Huntingdon (-aft.1219, unmarried)
 Isobel of Huntingdon (1199–1251), married firstly, Henry de Percy and had issue and secondly, Robert Bruce, 4th Lord of Annandale, by whom she had two sons, including Robert de Brus, 5th Lord of Annandale.
 John of Scotland, Earl of Huntingdon (1207 – 6 June 1237), married Elen ferch Llywelyn. He succeeded his uncle Ranulf as Earl of Chester in 1232, but died childless.
 Henry of Huntingdon (died young)

Earl David also had three illegitimate children:
Henry of Stirling
Henry of Brechin
Ada, married Malise, son of Ferchar, Earl of Strathearn

After the extinction of the senior line of the Scottish royal house in 1290, when the legitimate line of William the Lion of Scotland ended, David's descendants were the prime candidates for the throne. The two most notable claimants to the throne, Robert Bruce, 5th Lord of Annandale (grandfather of King Robert I of Scotland) and John Balliol were his descendants through David's daughters Isobel and Margaret, respectively.

In popular culture

Sir Walter Scott's 1825 novel The Talisman features Earl David in his capacity as a prince of Scotland as a crusader on the Third Crusade.  For the majority of the novel, Earl David operates under an alias: Sir Kenneth of the Couchant Leopard.  Earl David's adventures are highly fictionalized for this novel.

The television series Robin of Sherwood features Earl David of Huntingdon.  The first reference to Earl David (by name only) is in the episode "The Prisoner", in which Prince John states that Earl David is a "dissident" who opposes Prince John's possible succession as King Richard's heir should Richard die without a legitimate heir of his body.  The earl himself appears in the first part of "Herne's Son" in which he is not referred to directly as David; his character is the father of Robert of Huntingdon, the second son of Herne to feature in the series adopting the alias of Robin Hood.  In the episode "Rutterkin", the earl appears again with a fictitious brother named Edgar, and though he is again not referred to directly as David, it is definitively stated that the earl is the brother of the king of Scotland (as Earl David was the brother of King William The Lion of Scotland).  ("The Prisoner", "Herne's Son" and "Rutterkin" were all written by Richard Carpenter.)  Earl David was played by Michael Craig.

Earl David features briefly in the 2013 Robin Hood novel The Arrow of Sherwood by Lauren Johnson.  He is depicted at the siege of Nottingham Castle in support of King Richard in 1194.

References

1140s births
1219 deaths
David
Christians of the Third Crusade
David
Scottish princes
12th-century Scottish people
13th-century Scottish people
Place of birth missing
People associated with Dundee
Earls of Huntingdon (1065 creation)
Mormaers of Lennox